Pleurocybella is a genus of fungus in the family Phyllotopsidaceae.

References

External links

Agaricales genera
Taxa named by Rolf Singer